John Ainsley may refer to:

 John Mark Ainsley (born 1963), English tenor
 William Ainsley (John William Ainsley, 1898–1976), Labour Member of Parliament for North West Durham
 John Colpitts Ainsley (1860–1937), Campbell canning pioneer and owner of Ainsley House